Nadiadwala Grandson Entertainment Pvt Ltd (NGE) is an Indian film production company based in Mumbai.

The Nadiadwala family have been in film production since 1955, continuing this legacy Sajid Nadiadwala established the company in 2005. It is a part of the Hindi film industry that is involved in Motion picture, radio, television and other entertainment activities. Rakesh Madhotra is the current CEO of the company.

Background

The Nadiadwala family, who migrated to Mumbai from Nadiad, Gujarat, have been in the film industry for three generations, starting with A. K. Nadiadwala followed by his son Sulieman Nadiadwala and now grandson Sajid Nadiadwala. Presently, they are celebrating 63 years of their existence in the film industry. The first film to be produced under their legacy was Inspector (1956) by Abdul Karim Nadiadwala. He further went on to produce movies like Taj Mahal (1963) and Chitralekha (1964).

Productions

1992—1997

The company's first production came in 1992 with Bharat Rangachary's Zulm Ki Hukumat, starring an ensemble cast including Suniel Shetty and Govinda, which was not well appreciated. The next two produced films were Rangachary's Waqt Hamara Hai (1993) starring Akshay Kumar as well as Suniel Shetty, and Aziz Sejawal's Andolan (1995) starring Govinda, Mamta Kulkarni and Sanjay Dutt. Both these films performed moderately well at the box office. The former marked Sajid Nadiadwala's first production to star Kumar.

Jeet was also Nadiadwala's first production to star Salman Khan. David Dhawan's comedy Judwaa, released in February 1997, marked the next film of NGK.

2000—2009

NGK began the 2000s decade by reteaming with Raj Kanwar to produce the romantic comedy Har Dil Jo Pyar Karega (2000) starring Salman Khan opposite Preity Zinta and Rani Mukerji. It went on to gross  worldwide and was the sixth highest-grossing film that year. From 2001 to 2003, NGK didn't produce any films.

The banner came back in 2004 by collaborating with David Dhawan for the second time on the musical romantic comedy Mujhse Shaadi Karogi which featured Salman Khan, Akshay Kumar and Priyanka Chopra and was declared a Super Hit by Box Office India. This was followed by Shirish Kunder's directorial debut Jaan-E-Mann in 2006. The feature which saw Preity Zinta, Salman Khan and Akshay Kumar play lead roles. was critically and commercially unprofitable.

In 2007, NGK produced Sajid Khan's comedy Heyy Babyy starring Akshay Kumar, Vidya Balan, Riteish Deshmukh and Fardeen Khan. Heyy Babyy, which marked the first collaboration between Nadiadwala and Deshmukh, was a critical and commercial success with revenues of  but received mixed-to-negative reviews from critics.

2010—present

NGK achieved further success in 2010, producing the Sajid Khan-directed comedy Housefull, which consisted of an ensemble cast including Akshay Kumar, Deepika Padukone, Riteish Deshmukh, Lara Dutta, Arjun Rampal and Jiah Khan.. The movie grossed over  worldwide, thus becoming NGK's highest-grossing release at that point, and was the fourth top-earning Bollywood production of the year, but its response was generally mixed. Housefull was the first installment of the Housefull film franchise as well. The company's second production of the year was Siddharth Anand's Anjaana Anjaani, a romantic comedy featuring Ranbir Kapoor and Priyanka Chopra, which was profitable at the box office.

Filmography

References

External links
 

Film production companies based in Mumbai
2005 establishments in Maharashtra
Indian companies established in 2005
Mass media companies established in 2005